Vardin (also Romanized as Vardīn and Verdin; also known as Dardīn) is a village in Sina Rural District, in the Central District of Varzaqan County, East Azerbaijan Province, Iran. At the 2006 census, its population was 496, in 98 families.

References 

Towns and villages in Varzaqan County